Olorus is a genus of leaf beetles in the subfamily Eumolpinae. It is found in Asia.

Species
 Olorus dentipes Tan, 1984
 Olorus femoralis Chapuis, 1874

Synonyms:
 Olorus speciosus Berlioz, 1917: synonym of Olorus femoralis Chapuis, 1874
 Olorus femoratus (Jacoby, 1889): synonym of Olorus femoralis Chapuis, 1874

References

Eumolpinae
Chrysomelidae genera
Beetles of Asia
Taxa named by Félicien Chapuis